Kopáčsky ostrov is a nature reserve in the Podunajské Biskupice district of Bratislava, Slovakia. The nature reserve covers an area of 82.62 ha on the left shore of the Danube. It has a protection level of 5 (the highest) under the Slovak nature protection system. The nature reserve is part of the Dunajské luhy Protected Landscape Area.

Description
The area was declared as a protected area with the goal to protect a mosaic of steppe, forest-steppe and floodplain forest communities. It is used for scientific research and educational purposes.

Flora
On the drier parts of the nature reserve grow various species of orchids, including Orchis militaris, Anacamptis coriophora and Anacamptis morio.

References

Geography of Bratislava Region
Protected areas of Slovakia